This article lists the team squads of the  2004 FIFA U-19 Women's World Championship, held in Thailand from 10 to 27 November 2004.

Group A

Australia

Coach: Adrian Santrac

Australia took a squad of 21 players.

Canada

Head coach: Ian Bridge

Germany

Head coach: Silvia Neid

Thailand

Head coach: Prapol Pongpanich

Group B

Brazil

Head coach: Luiz Ferreira

China PR

The China squad consisted of 21 players.

Nigeria

Head coach: Felix Ibe Ukwu

Italy

The Italy squad consisted of 21 players.

Group C

South Korea 

The South Korea squad consisted of 21 players.
Coach: Baek Jong-chul

Russia

Head coach: Valentin Grishin

Spain

The Spain squad consisted of 21 players.
Coach: Ignacio Quereda

United States

The USA squad consisted of 21 players.

Notes

References

U-19 Women's World Championship Squads, 2004
FIFA U-20 Women's World Cup squads
2004 in youth sport